Nicolò Corradinimay refer to
Nicolò Corradini (composer) (c. 1585–1646), Italian composer and organist
Nicolò Corradini (skier) (born 1964), Italian ski-orienteering competitor